Trisha Baga (born 1985 Venice, Florida) is an American artist living and working in New York City. Her work is installation based and incorporates video, performance, and found objects.

Career
Beginning in 2012 Baga began to use 3D projectors and 3D glasses  for a more immersive effect as exhibited at West Street Gallery. In 2015 she added clay sculptures to her exhibitions, an outgrowth of  her involvement with the ceramics club, a loosely gathered group of artists who meet at Greenwich House Pottery. Some of her earlier works, such as Madonna y El Niño (2010–2011) involved Baga performing in front of and along with her projections, but by her 2012-13 solo exhibition Plymouth Rock 2 at the Whitney Museum of American Art, she began using found objects  (sometimes altered—as with a boom box painted with textured paint) in front of her projections in installations where she viewed "all things in the projection as bodies," preferring the "natural frequency" and one-sided/directional qualities of existing objects over the self-contained nature of sculpture. Her Solo exhibitions include: Orlando at Greene Naftali, New York (2015); Gravity at Peep-Hole, Milan (2013); Florida at  Société, Berlin (2013); Plymouth Rock 2 at Whitney Museum of American Art, New York (2012); and The Biggest Circle at Greene Naftali, New York (2011). Her work is  collected internationally and is in the permanent collection of the Whitney Museum of American Art, New York. She has received a Louis Comfort Tiffany Foundation Award (2012).

Education 
Trisha Baga attended Cooper Union, receiving her Bachelor of Fine arts in 2007. She received her MFA from Milton Avery Graduate School of the Arts at Bard College in 2010.

Work 
Baga's videos and installations are non-linear in nature, often rejecting overt narratives  and using a visually cacophonous, arguably psychedelic, aesthetic and humor to explore pathos, gender identity, environmental issues, pop culture, and more.  Art critic Roberta Smith touches on themes in Baga's work in her review of the exhibition Orlando in the New York Times, writing, "Here Ms. Baga crosses Orlando, Fla., with 'Orlando,' Virginia Woolf’s novel of same-sex love and gender fluidity; people on a cruise ship; and, according to the gallery news release, at least, catastrophic global warming." Baga sees her distancing from narrative as being related to her attitude toward progress, "I have issues with progress – the concept of it, the stretch towards it, the motivations behind it, and its psychological implications, especially in regard to America and American history and ideals. It seems like an insatiable hunger, or an excuse to take things away from other people. I think it is also related to how I’ve been stepping away from narrative video, or at least making an attempt to curve an abstraction of the arc, back into a circle. A straight line is often the least efficient way to get anywhere." While topics and imagery shift depending on the work, this meandering approach to storytelling and layered approach to installation weave through the artist's oeuvre to date.

Exhibitions

Selected solo exhibitions 
 2015 Orlando, Greene Naftali, New York, NY
 2014 Trisha Baga, Zabludowicz Collection, London
 2014 FREE INTERNET, Gio Marconi, Milan
 2013 Gravity, Peep-Hole at Fonderia Battaglia, Milan
 2013 Florida, Société Berlin
 2012 The Biggest Circle, Greene Naftali, New York
 2012 Plymouth Rock 2, Whitney Museum of American Art, New York
 2012 World Peace, Kunstverein Munich, Munich

Selected group exhibitions 
 2015 Co-Workers The Network as Artist,  Musée d’Art Moderne de la Ville de Paris, Paris, France
 2015 Strange Pilgrims, The Contemporary Austin, Austin, TX
 2015 The New Human: You and I in Global Wonderland, Moderna Museet, Malmö
 2014 Private Settings: Art After the Internet, Museum of Modern Art, Poland, Warsaw
 2014 Dark Velocity, CCS Bard, Annondale-on-Hudson, New York
 2013 Freak Out, Greene Naftali, New York, NY
 2013 Meanwhile... Suddenly and Then, Lyon Biennale, Lyon, France
 2012 New Pictures of Common Objects, MOMA PS1, New York, NY
 2011 The Great White Way Goes Black, Vilma Gold, London, England
 2011 Fernando, Franklin Street Works, Stamford, Connecticut
 2010 Beside Himself, Ditch Projects, Springfield, OR

References

1985 births
People from Venice, Florida
Artists from Florida
American women installation artists
American installation artists
Cooper Union alumni
Bard College alumni
21st-century American artists
21st-century American women artists
Living people